50th Anniversary Concert in Japan (Japanese title,  = American visit 50th anniversary commemorative Japanese performance) is a live concert album recorded by jazz pianist Toshiko Akiyoshi and released in Japan on the T-toc Record label.   The concert commemorated 50 years since Akiyoshi left Japan to study and play jazz in the US and the album received several Japanese music awards including a "special award" for Japanese Jazz from Swing Journal magazine.

Track listing
All compositions by Toshiko Akiyoshi except as noted:
"Long Yellow Road"
"Kogun"
"Farewell To Mingus"
"The Village" ~ "Lady Liberty"
"Trinkle Tinkle" (T. Monk)
"Sumie"
"Chasing After Love"

Personnel
Toshiko Akiyoshi – piano
Lew Tabackin – tenor saxophone, flute
George Mraz – bass
Lewis Nash – drums

References / External Links / Awards
T-toc Records TTOC-0006
2006 Swing Journal Japan Jazz special award (Japanese link)

Toshiko Akiyoshi live albums
2006 live albums